Daychounieh ( translit. al-Dayšūniyat) (also Al-Daychounieh)  is a village in the Matn District of the Mount Lebanon Governorate, Lebanon.  Daychounieh is administered by Mansourieh municipality.

Overview
Daychounieh native people are from Sakr, Khoury and Abou Khalil families.

Etymology

Geography 

Daychounieh is 11 km to the Capital (Beirut), 26 km to the Province Administrative Center (Baabda) and 15 km to the Caza Administrative Center (Jdeideh).

Daychounieh is accessible from Mansourieh main road.

Beirut River flows east to west from Lebanon's mountains passing through Daychounieh to the Mediterranean Sea.

Demographics

As of 2009, Daychounieh houses a population of approx. 800, of which 98 constitute the electorate and 153 are native residents.
The number of residences is approx. 250.

References and footnotes

External links
Mansouriyeh - Mkalles - Daychouniyeh,   Localiban

Populated places in the Matn District